Haruka Nakaguchi (born 13 January 1998) is a Japanese sports shooter. She competed in the women's 10 metre air rifle event at the 2020 Summer Olympics.

References

External links
 

1998 births
Living people
Japanese female sport shooters
Olympic shooters of Japan
Shooters at the 2020 Summer Olympics
Place of birth missing (living people)
21st-century Japanese women